Between the Sheets is the second studio album of the jazz group Fourplay which was released in August 1993 on Warner Bros. Records. The album peaked at No. 2 on the Billboard Top Jazz Albums chart and No. 15 on the Billboard Top R&B Albums chart.  Between the Sheets has sold over 500,000 copies in the United States and has thus been certified gold by the RIAA.

Critical reception

Between the Sheets was Grammy nominated in the category of Best Contemporary Jazz Performance (Instrumental)

Track listing

Personnel 
Fourplay
 Bob James – Yamaha C7 MIDI grand piano, Yamaha Disklavier piano, synthesizers, string orchestrations, arrangements (1, 3, 4, 7)
 Lee Ritenour – electric guitars, guitar synthesizer (2, 3, 5, 8), arrangements (2, 3, 6, 9)
 Nathan East – 5 and 6-string bass guitars, fretless basses, lead chant (1), chorus chant (1), lead vocals (3), backing vocals (3), arrangements (3, 5)
 Harvey Mason – drums, percussion, marimba, vibraphone, chimes, glockenspiel, arrangements (3, 8, 10, 11)

Additional Musicians
 Harvey Mason, Jr. – synthesizer programming, computer sequencing, drum programming (3)
 Marcel East – arrangements (5)
 Dee Fredrix – chorus chant (1)
 Chaka Khan – lead vocals (3), backing vocals (3)
 Phillip Bailey – backing vocals (3)
 Chanté Moore – backing vocals (3)
 Phil Perry – backing vocals (3)

Production 
 Bob James – producer, executive producer
 Nathan East – producer
 Lee Ritenour – producer
 Harvey Mason, Sr. – producer
 Don Murray – recording, mixing
 Neal Avron – assistant engineer
 Mike Kloster – assistant engineer
 Mike Piersante – assistant engineer
 Marcel East – vocal recording 
 Harvey Mason, Jr. – technician 
 Robert Vosgien – digital editing, additional editing, additional mastering
 Wally Traugott – mastering
 Debra Johnson – production coordinator 
 Kim Champagne – art direction, design 
 Stuart Watson – photography

Studios
 Recorded at Sunset Sound (Hollywood, California) and Pyramid Sound Recording Studios (Ithaca, New York).
 Edited at CMS Digital (Pasadena, California).
 Mastered at Capitol Mastering (Hollywood, California).

Charts

References

Fourplay albums
1993 albums
Smooth jazz albums
Warner Records albums
Albums produced by Nathan East